Alucita pliginskii is a moth of the family Alucitidae. It is found in Ukraine.

References

Moths described in 2000
Alucitidae
Moths of Europe